Hiroden Streetcar route #3 (Hiroden-nishi-hiroshima – Hiroshima Port Route) runs between Hiroden-Nishi-Hiroshima station and Hiroshima Port.

Overview

Lines
Hiroden Streetcar route #3 is made up with next two lines, and both lines are linked up with each other at Kamiya-cho-nishi Station. The train goes straight through from each side.

 █ Hiroden Main Line
 █ Hiroden Ujina Line

Stations

References 

3